Diego Falcinelli (born 26 June 1991) is an Italian professional footballer who plays as a striker for  club Modena.

Club career

Pontevecchio
Born in Marsciano, in the Province of Perugia, Falcinelli started his career at Ponte San Giovanni (a frazione of Perugia) based club Pontevecchio. He was loaned to Internazionale in June 2007. He played one friendly for the first team in February 2008. He also won the Campionato Nazionale Allievi with Inter U17 youth team.

On 1 July 2008, he returned to Perugia, making his Serie D debut.

Sassuolo
On 2 July 2009, Falcinelli was signed by Sassuolo for the youth team. He also awarded no.26 shirt of the first team, which he made his Serie B debut on 28 November 2009, replacing Gianluigi Bianco in the 82nd minute and assisting Alessandro Noselli for the equalising goal a minute later as Sassuolo drew 2–2 with Ancona.

Foligno
On 26 July 2010, Falcinelli left for Lega Pro Prima Divisione club Foligno in a co-ownership deal, for a peppercorn fee of one hundred euro. He made his debut on 8 August 2010, in 2010–11 Coppa Italia first round. Since the cup second round, he partnered with Matteo Cavagna and Stefano Giacomelli in a 4–3–3 formation, only missing rounds 6 and 7 of the league.

Return to Sassuolo
In June 2011 Sassuolo re-signed Falcinelli on a three-year contract, for a transfer fee of €25,000. In January 2012 he was signed by Juve Stabia in a temporary deal.

Lanciano and Perugia loans
Falcinelli spent two seasons on loan to Serie B club Lanciano, scoring nine goals from 2012 to 2014.

During the 2014 summer transfer window, he joined newly promoted Serie B club Perugia. He scored a career high of 14 goals for the hometown club in 2014–15 Serie B, making him secure a place for Sassuolo in 2015–16 Serie A season.

2015–16 season at Sassuolo
Falcinelli picked no.9 shirt in 2015–16 season. On 14 January 2016, he signed a -year contract.

Crotone (loan)
On 31 August 2016, Falcinelli  left for Serie A newcomer Crotone on loan. He scored three goals against Empoli on 29 January 2017. He also scored once on 28 May (round 38), a 3–1 win against Lazio; Crotone secured three points to survive from relegation as well as ranked higher than Empoli for the second time of the season (the team ranked higher than Empoli in round 2; from round 2 to 37 Crotone was in the relegation zone)

Falcinelli signed a new five-year contract with Sassuolo on 25 August 2017.

Fiorentina (loan)
In January 2018, Falcinelli joined Fiorentina on loan until 30 June 2018 as part of swap deal, in which Khouma Babacar moved the other way. Fiorentina also secured an option to sign Falcinelli permanently from Sassuolo.

Bologna
On 4 July 2018, Falcinelli joined Bologna on a four-year contract.

Return to Perugia
On 2 September 2019, he returned to Perugia on a season-long loan.

Loan to Red Star Belgrade
Coach Siniša Mihajlović, was aware that his former club, Red Star Belgrade, were searching for an experienced striker. Dejan Stanković, having been recently promoted to coach, accepted Mihajlović's suggestion on Falcinelli. Falcinelli and Red Star signed a year-long loan agreement.

Modena
On 6 July 2022, Falcinelli joined Modena on a two-year contract, with an option for a third year.

International career
Falcinelli received a call-up to Italy under-20 Lega Pro representative team in September 2010. He also received a call-up to Italy Amateur U18 team and Italy U19 team.

He played once for Italy under-21 Serie B representative team in 2011–12 season.

On 31 May 2017, he debuted for the Italy national team in a non-FIFA sanctioned friendly game against San Marino, which ended in a 8–0 win for Italy.

Career statistics

Club

Honours
Red Star Belgrade
 Serbian SuperLiga: 2020–21
 Serbian Cup: 2020–21

References

External links
 
 Football.it Profile 

1991 births
Living people
People from Marsciano
Footballers from Umbria
Association football forwards
Italian footballers
Serie A players
Serie B players
Serie C players
Serie D players
Inter Milan players
U.S. Sassuolo Calcio players
A.S.D. Città di Foligno 1928 players
S.S. Juve Stabia players
S.S. Virtus Lanciano 1924 players
A.C. Perugia Calcio players
F.C. Crotone players
ACF Fiorentina players
Bologna F.C. 1909 players
Modena F.C. 2018 players
Serbian SuperLiga players
Red Star Belgrade footballers
Expatriate footballers in Serbia
Italian expatriate footballers
Italian expatriate sportspeople in Serbia
Sportspeople from the Province of Perugia